Hierodula modesta is a species of praying mantis in the family Mantidae.

Subspecies
These two subspecies belong to the species Hierodula modesta:
 Hierodula modesta dentata Beier, 1942
 Hierodula modesta modesta Brunner v.W., 1898

References

modesta
Articles created by Qbugbot
Insects described in 1898